Melissa Osborne is an American Democratic Party politician currently serving as a member of the Connecticut House of Representatives from the 16th district, which encompasses the town of Simsbury, since 2023. Osborne was first elected in 2022 over Republican challenger Mike Paine by 1,500 votes. Osborne had previously run against, and lost to, Republican incumbent Kevin Witkos in 2014, 2018, and 2020.

References

Living people
Democratic Party members of the Connecticut House of Representatives
People from Simsbury, Connecticut
21st-century American politicians
21st-century American women politicians
Year of birth missing (living people)